Bedwas Workmen's Hall, built in 1923, is a community hall situated in the town of Bedwas, in south Wales.

It is a Grade II listed building, but still for hire and regularly used for a range of activities including plays, children's parties and music events - having a generous sized performance space for all types of professional and amateur productions.

It is now run by the Bedwas Workmen's Hall Community Centre (Charity No.1006294)

Footnotes

Buildings and structures in Caerphilly County Borough
Grade II listed buildings in Caerphilly County Borough